2017 Lesotho Independence Cup is a football tournament of Lesotho. It had 4 participants, the top 4 of 2016–17 Lesotho Premier League: Bantu, Lioli, LCS and Kick 4 Life. Part of the prize money would also donate to school or orphanage that were chosen by the participants.

Matches

Semi-finals

Third-place match

Final

References

 

Football competitions in Lesotho
Independence Cup
Lesotho